The 2012 European Badminton Championships were the 23rd tournament of the European Badminton Championships. They were held in Karlskrona, Sweden, from 16–21 April 2012, and they were organised by the Badminton Europe and Svenska Badmintonförbundet. The competitions were held in Telenor Arena.

Medalists

Results

Men's singles

Women's singles

Men's doubles

Women's doubles

Mixed doubles

Medal table

External links
2012 European Championships 
European Championships 2012 at tournamentsoftware.com

European Badminton Championships
European Badminton Championships
International sports competitions hosted by Sweden
2012 in Swedish sport
Badminton tournaments in Sweden
Sports competitions in Karlskrona
April 2012 sports events in Europe